Piper-Heidsieck is a Champagne house   founded by Florens-Louis Heidsieck on 16 July 1785 in Reims.  Heidsieck  joined with  Piper  in October 1839. In the late 1980s, Piper-Heidsieck became part of the Rémy Cointreau wine and spirits group. It was sold in 2011 to Européenne de Participation Industrielle, a privately owned holding company of French luxury brands.

Marilyn Monroe was one of the House's earliest supporters, rumoured to have kept a month's supply of champagne in her kitchen.

Champagne

Piper-Heidsieck  produces different champagnes, all with  a non-malolactic, low-dosage method:
 
 Cuvée Brut (non-vintage) (Composition: 55% Pinot Noir, 15% Chardonnay, 30% Pinot Meunier.)
 Rosé Sauvage (non-vintage) (Composition: 45% Pinot noir, 15% Chardonnay, 40% Pinot Meunier)
 Cuvée Sublime (non-vintage) A demi-sec champagne. (Composition: 55% Pinot noir, 15% Chardonnay, 30% Pinot Meunier)
 Brut (Vintage 2006) (vintage) A special release from a year considered exceptional by Piper-Heidsieck. (Composition: Pinot Noir, Chardonnay.)
 Cuvée Rare (vintage 2002) (Composition: 30% Pinot noir, 70% Chardonnay.)

Owning no vineyards of their own, Piper-Heidsieck sources grapes from 60 vineyards in the Champagne region, and  produces around five million bottles of champagne a year.

History
After founder Florens-Louis Heidsieck died in 1828, the business was taken over by his nephew, Christian Heidsieck, and his cousin Henri-Guillaume Piper. These combined to form the Piper-Heidsieck house after Henri Piper married the widow of Christian Heidsieck in 1838.

See also
 List of Champagne houses

References

External links
 
Champagne Piper-Heidsieck (official website)

Champagne producers
Food and drink companies established in 1785